Gwani Kalat, or "the fort of beautiful ladies", is a city located in Balochistan, Pakistan.

Populated places in Balochistan, Pakistan